Banjar is a district (kecamatan) in the regency of Buleleng in northern Bali, Indonesia. A notable waterfall, Singsing Waterfall is located in the district. It is located in the village of Temukus, around 3 km from Lovina Beach and 13 km from Singaraja City. In the City of Banjar there is also a large temple.

References 

Districts of Bali